"Nur mit Dir" (English: ″Only with You″) is a song by German recording artist Helene Fischer. It was written by Sebastian Rätzel, Tobias Schwall, and Robert Wroblewski and produced by Thorsten Brötzmann and Roman Lüth for her self-titled eighth studio album (2017). The song was released as the album's lead single along with "Herzbeben" on 12 May 2017, while an extended play featuring seven additional remixes was released on 30 June 2017. "Nur mit dir" charted in Austria and Switzerland and peaked at number 34 on the German Singles Chart, becoming Fischer's sixth top forty entry.

Track listings 
iTunes EP – The Mixes
"Nur mit dir" (Extended Mix) – 6:06
"Nur mit dir" (Stereoact Radio Remix) – 4:08
"Nur mit dir" (Mania Fox Remix) – 4:08
"Nur mit dir" (Franz Rapid Extended Mix) – 5:59
"Nur mit dir" (Album Version) 4:09
"Nur mit dir" (Stereoact Extended Remix) 5:22
"Nur mit dir" (Mania Fox Extended Remix) 5:21
"Nur mit dir" (Harris & Ford Remix) – 5:04

Charts

Certifications

References 

2017 songs
2017 singles
Helene Fischer songs
Schlager songs
German-language songs
Polydor Records singles